Kwik Fit is a car servicing and repair company in the United Kingdom, specialising in tyres, brakes, exhausts, MOT testing, car servicing, air conditioning recharge, oil changes. Kwik Fit also has location in continental Europe.

History

Sir Tom Farmer opened the first Kwik Fit location in McDonald Road, Edinburgh, Scotland, in 1971. In May 1995, Kwik Fit Insurance, part of Kwik Fit Financial Services, was formed, and has since grown to become one of the leading car insurance distributors in the United Kingdom.

In October 1999, Kwik Fit had grown to over two thousand locations throughout Europe, and Farmer sold the company to the Ford Motor Company for US$1.6bn. A decision by Ford to concentrate on its core business, led to the sale of Kwik Fit in August 2002, to CVC Capital Partners. In June 2005, Kwik Fit was sold for £800m, to PAI Partners, a leading French-based private equity firm.

The Kwik Fit Financial Services arm of the business, was sold by PAI to Fortis Insurance UK, now Ageas (UK) Limited, for a figure of £215m in July 2010. The tyre retailing and service centre business was bought by Itochu Corporation in March 2011.

Advertising
First shown in 1984, the adverts “You Can't Get Better Than a Kwik Fit Fitter” were broadcast on the main television channels, in the United Kingdom. The “Kwik Fit Fitter” returned to television in August 2008, with the campaign "You'll Be Amazed at What We Do".

Training
Kwik Fit received its first national training award in 1990. In January 2009, Kwik Fit was awarded Beacon status from the Learning and Skills Improvement Service (LSIS) for its further education training programs. This was given following a successful inspection by Ofsted, in which programs were graded 'outstanding'.

See also
Halfords Autocentre

References

External links

 

Automotive companies of the United Kingdom
Automotive repair shops
CVC Capital Partners companies
1971 establishments in Scotland
British companies established in 1971
Retail companies established in 1971
Companies based in Edinburgh